When a Man Sees Red is a 1934 American Western film written and directed by Alan James and starring Buck Jones, Peggy Campbell, Dorothy Revier, LeRoy Mason, Syd Saylor and Frank LaRue. It was released on November 24, 1934, by Universal Pictures.

Plot

Cast 
Buck Jones as Buck Benson 
Peggy Campbell as Mary Lawrence
Dorothy Revier as Barbara Gordon
LeRoy Mason as Dick Brady
Syd Saylor as Ben
Frank LaRue as Radcliffe
Libby Taylor as Mandy
Charles K. French as Padre
Jack Rockwell as Sheriff Carlson
Bob Kortman as Henchman Spook
William Steele as Henchman Speck

References

External links 
 

1934 films
American Western (genre) films
1934 Western (genre) films
Universal Pictures films
Films directed by Alan James
American black-and-white films
1930s English-language films
1930s American films